Norma Tallinn is a now defunct Estonian football club. Norma Tallinn became the first Estonian champions after the Soviet Union collapse, they went on to defend their title next year, in 1993. Norma also won the Estonian Cup in 1994. The club was relegated to the second division in 1995 and to the third the following year. Norma Tallinn were dissolved after the 1996/1997 season.

History
Founded in 1959, Norma Tallinn was one of the biggest football clubs in Estonian SSR. The club participated in 32 Estonian SSR championships (more than any other team), winning the title on five occasions, as well as winning six Estonian SSR Cup titles.

After Estonia regained its independence in 1991, Norma joined the newly formed Estonian Meistriliiga. Alongside their rivals Lantana Tallinn (Nikol Tallinn back then), the club became very popular among the ethnic Russian minority in Estonia. Norma won the first two Meistriliiga titles.

In 1994, Norma finished level on points with Flora Tallinn and according to the rules, had to play in a championship playoff, but, as a protest against the disqualification of Tevalte Tallinn because of match fixing allegations, Norma decided to field their youth squad. Flora won the playoff 5–2.

The following season Norma Tallinn were relegated to the Esiliiga.

Achievements
Meistriliiga: (2)
1992, 1992–93

Estonian Cup: (1)
1993–94

Estonian SSR Championship: (5)
1964, 1967, 1970, 1979, 1988

Estonian SSR Cup: (6)
1962, 1965, 1971, 1973, 1974, 1989

Norma Tallinn in Estonian Football

*Did not participate

Norma Tallinn in Europe
 1Q = 1st Qualifying Round

Managers

 Uno Piir (1959)
 Uno Piir (1962–89)
 Valeri Bondarenko (1991–93)
 Mait Kebina (1994)
 Eduard Belkin (1994)
 Juri Tšurilkin (1994–95)

References

 
Norma Tallinn
Norma Tallinn
Football clubs in Tallinn
1959 establishments in Estonia
1997 disestablishments in Estonia
Association football clubs established in 1959